Kaunt is a village which is very near to the main city of Bhiwani, in the Bhiwani district of the Indian state of Haryana. , the village had 749 households with a total population of 4,017 of which 2,143 were male and 1,874 female.

References

Villages in Bhiwani district